Agustín Loser (born 12 October 1997) is an Argentine professional volleyball player. He is a member of the Argentina national team, and a bronze medallist at the Olympic Games Tokyo 2020. At the professional club level, he plays for Allianz Milano.

Honours

Clubs
 National championships
 2017/2018  Argentine Cup, with Ciudad Vóley
 2018/2019  Argentine Championship, with Bolívar Vóley

Youth national team
 2014  CSV U19 South American Championship
 2015  FIVB U19 World Championship
 2016  CSV U23 South American Championship
 2016  CSV U21 South American Championship
 2017  FIVB U23 World Championship

Individual awards
 2016: CSV U21 South American Championship – Best Middle Blocker
 2018: Argentine Championship – Best Middle Blocker
 2021: CSV South American Championship – Best Middle Blocker

References

External links

 
 
 Player profile at LegaVolley.it  
 Player profile at Volleybox.net

1997 births
Living people
Sportspeople from Mendoza, Argentina
Argentine men's volleyball players
Olympic volleyball players of Argentina
Olympic medalists in volleyball
Olympic bronze medalists for Argentina
Medalists at the 2020 Summer Olympics
Volleyball players at the 2020 Summer Olympics
Argentine Champions of men's volleyball
Argentine expatriate sportspeople in France
Expatriate volleyball players in France
Argentine expatriate sportspeople in Italy
Expatriate volleyball players in Italy
Middle blockers